Juan Caballero y Ocio (May 4, 1644 - April 11, 1707) was a priest remarkable for lavish gifts to the Catholic church and for charity.

Caballero was born and died in Querétaro, Mexico.  While still a layman he was mayor of his native city. After taking Holy Orders he held several high offices. He gave large sums of money to several churches, and founded and endowed in his native city the church and college of the Jesuits, enlarged the Franciscan church, built the Dominican church and convent, constructed the Chapel of Our Lady of Loretto, to which he gave all his family jewels, founded the convent of Capuchine nuns, and built a hospital or infirmary in St. Francis' convent.

He gave dowries to more than two hundred girls, and left large sums of money for daily charities. In the city of Mexico he rebuilt the church of Santa Clara and contributed generously to the construction of the churches of Sts. Philip Neri and Belen. In Guadalajara he finished the church of St. Dominic, and for the missions of the newly discovered California he gave $150,000.

Some years before his death he bequeathed his property for charitable purposes. He was remarkable for his humility and piety. He refused two bishoprics which were offered to him at different times, and the title of Adelantado (governor) of California, which the King of Spain sent him, after his generous donation to those missions. Every year he used to make a spiritual retreat, drawing at the same time his last will, and becoming the executor of his pious bequests until he renewed them the following year. The sums he left for charitable purposes were wonderfully preserved and increased for a century and a half, until the general spoliation of the Church of Mexico.

1644 births
1707 deaths
Mexican Roman Catholic priests
People of New Spain
People from Querétaro